Mirfatyh Zakiev (Зәкиев Мирфатых) is a Soviet and Russian controversial academic in the domain of Turkology scholar.

Education and career 
Mirfatyh holds a doctorate, and had served in a number of higher schools and institutes as a rector, director and department head (KGPI 1967–1986, IJALI 1986–1997).

A full member of the Academy of Sciences of the Tatarstan Republic, he was an ex-chairman of the Republican Parliament in the Tatar Autonomous Soviet Socialist Republic and had also headed the Scientific Commission of the Education Ministry of the Russian Federation for the philological sciences.

Reception 
For Zakiev's fundamental research in syntactic architecture of the Tatar language, academician B.A. Serebrennikov had commented: "This is the first most full and logically faultless monograph about the syntax of the Türkic languages".

Zakiev claims that "proto-Turkish is the starting point of the Indo-European languages", that Sumerian, Ancient Greek, Icelandic, Etruscan and Minoan are languages of Turkic origin, and that the Sumerians, Scythians and Sarmatians were of Turkic origin. These views are generally rejected by the vast majority of scholars (see Pseudo-Turkology) and he has been frequently described as an "alternative historian" and a "militant amateur".

Main publications

 "Hezerge Tatar edebi tele, Syntax", Kazan, 1958, in Tatar ("Хәзерге татар әдәби теле. Синтаксис", Казан, 1958)
 "Syntactic structure of the Tatar language", Kazan, 1963, in Russian ("Синтаксический строй татарского языка", Казань, 1963)
 School textbooks on Tatar language for upper grades of Tatar schools, republished from 1964 on. (Школьные учебники по татарскому языку для 8,9,10,11 классов татарских школ, начиная с 1964 года по наст. время выдержали по нескольку изданий)
 "Tatar halky telenen barlykka kilüe", Kazan, 1977 ("Татар халкы теленең барлыкка килүе", Казан, 1977, in Tatar). Examination of the Bulgarian Middle Age epitaphs found that contrary to the sanctioned doctrine, the first epitaph style belonged to the Bulgars of various local Turkic-speaking tribes which later developed into Tatar people, and the second epitaph style belonged to the Moslem Chuvashes who were assimilating Bulgarian language (Изучение булгарских сердневековых эпитафий показало что вопреки санкционированной доктрине, первый стиль эпитафий принадлежал булгарам различных местных тюрко-говорящих племен, которые позже развились в татарский народ, а второй стиль эпитафий принадлежал чувашам-мусульманам ассимилировавшим булгарский язык)
 "Volga Bulgars and their descendants", co-author Ya.F.Kuzmin-Yumanadi, Kazan, 1993, in Russian ("Волжские булгары и их потомки", соавт. Я.Ф.Кузьмин-Юманади, Казань, 1993, in Russian). Study established that Tatars are descendants of Bulgars, instead of Chuvashes, postulated by the sanctioned doctrine (Изучение доказывает что потомками булгар являются татары, а не чуваши, как это ошибочно утверждается в санкционированной доктрине).
 "Problems of language and origin of Volga Tatars", Kazan, 1986, in Russian ("Проблемы языка и происхождения волжских татар", Казань, 1986)
 "Tatars: Problems of a history and language", Kazan, 1995, in Russian ("Татары: Проблемы истории и языка", Казань, 1995)
 "Tatar grammar, Vol 3, Syntax", Kazan, 1992 and 1995 in Russian, Moscow – Kazan, 1999 in Tatar ("Татарская грамматика, Том 3, Синтаксис". Издания на русском: Казань, 1992 и 1995. Издание на татарском: – Москва-Казань, 1999)
 "Törki-Tatar ethnogenesis", Moscow-Kazan, 1998, in Tatar. ("Төрки-татар этногенезы", Мәскәü-Казан, 1998) Study discredits the sanctioned doctrine of Mongolo-Tatar origin of the modern Tatars. (В книге раскрыты древние местные этнические корни татар. На основе изучения имеющихся всевозможных источников доказывается несостоятельность мнения о монголо-татарском происхождении современных татар.)
 "Origin of Türks and Tatars", Moscow, 2003, in Russian ("Происхождение тюрков и татар, Москва, 2003). Study of local ethnic roots of Türks and Tatars discredits the sanctioned doctrine of Türkic late migration in 4th-6th centuries AD from Altai to Central and Middle Asia, Near East, Asia Minor, Western Siberia, Ural-Itil region, Caucasus and Balkans; and migration of Tatar-Bulgar ancestors to Ural-Itil region in 7th century AD from N.Pontic. (Впервые излагается научная точка зрения о местных этнических корнях тюрков и татар, доказывается несостоятельность мнения о приходе тюрков лишь в 4-6 вв. н.э. из Алтая в Центральную, Среднюю, Переднюю, Малую Азию, Западную Сибирь, Урало-Поволжье, на Кавказ и Балканы; о приходе предковтатар-булгар в Урало-Поволжье лишь в 7 в. н.э. якобы из Северного Причерноморья)

References

 Formal Curriculum Vitae ( In Russian'')

1928 births
Living people
People from Bavlinsky District
Communist Party of the Soviet Union members
Kazan Federal University alumni
Academic staff of Kazan Federal University
Recipients of the Order of Friendship of Peoples
Recipients of the Order of the Red Banner of Labour
Linguists from Russia
Linguists from the Soviet Union
Philologists
Pseudohistorians
Pseudolinguistics
Russian Turkologists